WHWA is a public radio station in Washburn, Wisconsin, licensed to the Wisconsin Educational Communications Board. The station is part of Wisconsin Public Radio (WPR), and airs WPR's "NPR News and Classical Network", consisting of classical music and news and talk programming. WHWA also broadcasts regional news and programming from studios in the Holden Fine Arts Center at the University of Wisconsin-Superior.  The WHWA transmitter is on Maple Hill, approximately four miles west of Washburn, co-located with WEGZ. The WHWA transmitter replaced a 38-Watt WPR translator (W284AN/104.7) in Ashland as part of an effort to improve public radio reception in the area.

References

External links
WHWA Official website

Wisconsin Public Radio
NPR member stations
HWA
Radio stations established in 2013
University of Wisconsin–Superior
2013 establishments in Wisconsin